The 2016 Motul Sepang 12 Hours was the seventeenth Sepang 12 Hours race held on Sepang International Circuit on 10 December 2016. The race was contested with GT3-spec cars, GTC-spec cars, GT4 (Supersport)-spec cars, MARC cars and touring cars. This was the second Sepang 12 Hours race organized by the Stéphane Ratel Organisation (SRO). The race was also the third and final round of the inaugural Intercontinental GT Challenge.

The race was won by the Audi R8 LMS run by Audi Sport Team Phoenix. Driven by  Robin Frijns, Christopher Haase and Laurens Vanthoor. The race victory saw Vanthoor win the inaugural drivers championship. Supported by third-placed teammates Pierre Kaffer, René Rast and Markus Winkelhock, Audi won the manufacturers championship.

Report

Paid Practice sessions

Free Practice sessions

Qualifying

Race

Event format

Race results
Class winners in bold.

See also
Sepang 12 Hours
Sepang International Circuit

References

External links

Sepang 12 Hours
Sepang 12 Hours
Sepang 12 Hours
Sepang